Kevin Braun is an American businessman, military instructor, and politician from the state of Kansas. A Republican, he represented the 5th district of the Kansas Senate, based in Leavenworth and western Kansas City from 2018 to 2021. He lost to Democrat Jeff Pittman in the 2020 election.

Career
In 2018, Steve Fitzgerald resigned from the Senate following an unsuccessful run for Congress, and Braun was appointed by the Leavenworth and Wyandotte County Republican parties to fill the seat. Prior to his appointment, Braun served in the United States Army Reserve for 32 years, including 5 years as an instructor at Fort Leavenworth, and additionally worked at a pharmaceutical company.

References

Living people
Republican Party Kansas state senators
21st-century American politicians
Year of birth missing (living people)
Friends University alumni